Breg pri Dobu is a small settlement just north of Dob pri Šentvidu in the Municipality of Ivančna Gorica in central Slovenia. The area is part of the historical region of Lower Carniola. The municipality is now included in the Central Slovenia Statistical Region.

Name
Breg pri Dobu was attested in historical sources as Rain in 1389 and Rayn in 1424. The name of the settlement was changed from Breg to Breg pri Dobu in 1953.

References

External links

Breg pri Dobu on Geopedia

Populated places in the Municipality of Ivančna Gorica